Tharai Thappattai or Thaarai Thappattai is a 2016 Tamil-language musical  art film written, produced and directed by Bala. The film features Sasikumar and Varalaxmi Sarathkumar in the leading roles, while Ilaiyaraaja composed the film's music based on karakattam. This film also happened to be Ilaiyaraaja's 1000th film. The film began production in 2013 and released on 14 January 2016. Ilaiyaraaja won the National Film Award for Best Background Score at the 63rd National Film Awards.

Plot

The story opens with a Discovery channel TV team led by an Indian guide woman asking an old man by the name of Saamipulavan to perform his art for their documentary. While he performs but refuses to change for commercial angle, his son, Sannasi and his troupe perform. Sannasi (Sasikumar) is the head of a music troupe, while Sooravali (Varalaxmi Sarathkumar) is the chief dancer, who loves him. Times are tough and the troupe jumps at a chance to perform at the Andaman Islands for a hefty sum. But they soon realise that the sponsors are more interested in the women, and not their dance. They are thrown out of the hotel and tickets back home torn when Sooravalli physically assaults them for their improper advances. The troupe manage to save money by manual labour and Sooravalli's performance ending in unconsciousness by fatigue to reach home by ship.

Humiliated, they return home, only to continue their struggle without work. At this time, Sooravali receives a marriage proposal from Karuppaiah (R. K. Suresh), who claims to have a government job and decent salary. Sannasi is angry at first and beats up Karuppaiah, but after Sooravali's mother pleads with him, he forces Sooravali to accept the proposal.

After Sooravali's marriage and departure, the troupe attempts to continue working but is rejected as Sooravali was the main attraction. Sannasi, with the help of the leader of a more successful troupe, finds a replacement but is forced to compromise with his principles and perform at a funeral.

Sannasi's father, Samipulavan (G. M. Kumar), who has always disapproved of what he considers his son's adulteration and lowering of the art form, lambasts him for this. Sannasi retaliates and insults Samipulavan's knowledge and talent, leaving him deeply hurt.

One day, Samipulavan is called to perform a concert in front of high ranking foreign officials, including the Governor of Australia. His performance is appreciated and he is lauded by the governor, finally validating him after years of rejection and obscurity. He returns home and tells Sannasi that he has won, but passes away immediately afterward.

After the funeral, Sooravali's mother visits Sannasi. He expresses his disappointment that Sooravali has never checked in after her marriage, not even upon his father's death. Sooravali's mother breaks down and tells Sannasi that she hasn't heard from Sooravali since the wedding. Sannasi is shocked to learn that Karuppaiah lied about his job and has disappeared with Sooravali.

Sannasi tracks Sooravali down and finds her in an unfamiliar house. It turns out that Karuppaiah is a pimp who married Sooravali so he could fulfill the request of a man who wanted her in return for a favor. Sooravali is eventually forced to be the surrogate for a wealthy man whose astrologer has divined that he requires a female heir born on a specific day, at a specific time.

Sannasi is discovered by Karuppaiah and beaten unconscious. Karuppaiah then takes Sooravali away for the delivery. At the hospital, the doctor refuses to perform a c-section because of complications that would endanger Sooravali or her child. Karuppaiah pays a morgue technician to secretly carry out the c-section.

Because the birth has to occur at a specific time, Karuppaiah instructs the technician to begin only when he whistles. As he and his men wait outside, Sannasi shows up and attacks them. He dispatches Karuppaiah's men and then goes after Karuppaiah, demanding to know Sooravali's whereabouts but Karuppaiah refuses to divulge it. Sannasi kills Karuppaiah by stabbing him in the throat with a piece of wood.

Sannasi then enters the morgue and kills the technician. He finds Sooravali and tries to wake her, but realizes that she has died after the technician carried out the c-section on his own. Sannasi is grief-stricken but upon hearing cries, he discovers that Sooravali's baby has survived. He takes the baby and returns home.

Cast

Sasikumar as Sannasi
Varalaxmi Sarathkumar as Sooravali
G. M. Kumar as Samipulavan
R. K. Suresh as Karuppaiah
Satish Kaushik
Pragathi
Gayathri Raghuram
Anthony Daasan
Ramya NSK as Ramya
Amudhavanan
Anandhi Ajay as Kalaivani
Arjun Maravan as Vellaiyan
Kavya Shaas as Karuppuchellam
Bharat varma
Jagadeesh
Naveen awaroop
Akshaya Kimmy as Tholaimalar
Sahana Sheddy as Sothiyam

Production
Director Bala finalised his next project following Paradesi (2013) only in October 2013 and revealed that he would make a film starring his former protege Sasikumar in the lead role, while G. V. Prakash Kumar and Kishore would be the film's composer and editor respectively. In January 2014, Bala decided to call Ilaiyaraaja in to the project to replace G. V. Prakash.

Early reports had suggested that Shriya Saran had been signed on to play the leading female role of a Karagattam dancer, but it was later noted that she had only been auditioned for the part. However, after also auditioning other actresses including Shravanthi Sainath, he then chose to offer Varalaxmi Sarathkumar the leading role and subsequently asked her to lose ten kilograms for the film. Sasikumar was asked to shave his trademark beard and sport a thin moustache, in order to reportedly play a Nadaswaram player in the movie. Furthermore, to look the part, he had to train for a month with folk singers and dancers brought in by Bala. Sasikumar also sported long hair for the film. Producer R. K. Suresh of Studio 9 Media Works, was signed on to play the antagonist in the film and undertook training in fight scenes with action choreographer Pandian. The team also selected Hindi film maker Satish Kaushik to portray a character in the film, and he joined the team in the third schedule, while director Haricharan of Thoovanam (2007) was also signed to portray his first acting role. In January 2015, reports revealed that Kannada actress Kaavya Sha had been given a pivotal role in the film, which will mark her Tamil debut, after singer Pragathi Guruprasad had opted out of the role.
Sahana Sheddy, who is well known for her role as Kavya on the Tamil serial, Azhagu (TV series) plays the role of one of the troupe dancers in this film.
The title of the film was announced in March 2014 to be Tharai Thappattai, after titles including Karagattam and Paarai had been considered. Also by March 2014, it was revealed that Ilaiyaraaja had finished recording 12 songs for this film using a live orchestra, in a span of six days. Furthermore, since folk dance is an integral part of the film, he had used folk musicians who are not associated with the film industry. The film's shoot took over 100 days to finish, while the makers had a three-month break in 2015, owing to Sasikumar's hand injury, which he suffered while filming the climax.

Soundtrack

The soundtrack has been composed by Ilaiyaraaja. The film has garnered a lot of expectations in being promoted as the 1000th film score of Ilaiyaraaja. The album was released in on December 25, after the Chennai floods. The soundtrack consists of seven tracks: five songs and two theme scores. Six of the tracks were released by Think Music in CDs, iTunes and on Store while one song was released as a single by Sa Re Ga Ma. The single released by Sa Re Ga Ma was the song Aarambam Aavadhu, a Viswanathan–Ramamoorthy number from the 1959 film Thanga Padhumai, remixed in this film. The teaser of the film was also released on the same day. The first paragraph of the song Idarinum is from the third Thirumurai, penned by Thirugnanasambandar. The remaining portions of Idarinum, from En Ullam Kovil, have been penned by Ilaiyaraaja. Paaruruvaaya is from Manickavasagar's Thiruvasagam.

The album became popular on iTunes and on social media and was widely lauded by the media.

Critical reception
Rediff wrote "Thaarai Thappattai has all the elements that you expect from the brilliant director and while it may not appeal to all, it is definitely worth a watch."
Baradwaj Rangan of the Hindu wrote "Bala essentially keeps making the same movie. He’s, repeatedly, to darkness, and love is but another stop on the tortuous road to doom. Plus, the highly stylised performances, which don’t seem to come from the actor so much as the director."

Awards 
At the 63rd National Film Awards, Ilaiyaraaja won for Best Background Score, a category bifurcated from Best Music Direction. However, he refused to accept the award, due to his displeasure with the awards committee's decision to bifurcate the Best Music Direction award, and explained, "What is the meaning of giving me an award for Best Music Direction – Background Score, and M. Jayachandran an award for Best Music Direction? It not only means that I have done an incomplete job as music director but also implies that only half of my work is good."

References

External links
 

2016 films
Films scored by Ilaiyaraaja
2010s Tamil-language films
Films directed by Bala (director)
Indian drama films
2016 drama films